The headquarters of the Connecticut Rivers Council of the Boy Scouts of America is located in East Hartford, Connecticut. The present council was formed as the result of the merger between the Indian Trails Council of Norwich, Connecticut and Long Rivers Council of Hartford, Connecticut. Now it is the largest council in the state with a youth membership of over 17,000 and a volunteer base of nearly 10,000 adults, serving for over half of the state.

The council's camps include the June Norcross Webster Scout Reservation in Ashford, Camp Mattatuck in Plymouth and Camp Workcoeman in New Hartford. See Boy Scout Camps in Connecticut, past and present below for more information on the individual camps.

The council's Order of the Arrow Lodge is the Tschitani Lodge #10.

Organization
Connecticut Rivers Council is divided into the following districts:
 Leaders of the Revolution District serves the following communities: Somers, Stafford, Union, Woodstock, Thompson, Ellington, Tolland, Willington, Ashford, Eastford, Pomfret, Putnam, Vernon, Coventry, Mansfield, Chaplin, Hampton, Brooklyn, Killingly, Bolton, Andover, Columbia, Windham, Scotland, Canterbury, Plainfield, Sterling, Hebron, Marlborough, Colchester, Columbia, Lebanon, Franklin, Bozrah, Sprague, Lisbon, Griswold, and Voluntown
 Charter Oak District serves the following communities: Bloomfield, Canton, East Granby, East Windsor, Enfield, Granby, Simsbury, South Windsor, Suffield, Windsor, Windsor Locks, Avon, Berlin, Bristol, East Hartford, Farmington, Glastonbury, Hartford, Manchester, New Britain, Newington, Plainville, Rocky Hill, West Hartford, and Wethersfield
 Western District serves the following communities: Barkhamsted, Beacon Falls, Bethlehem, Bridgewater, Burlington, Canaan,  Cheshire, Colebrook, Cornwall, Goshen, Hartland, Harwinton, Kent, Litchfield, Middlebury, Morris, Naugatuck, New Hartford, New Milford, Norfolk, North Canaan, Plymouth, Prospect, Roxbury, Salisbury, Sharon, Southbury, Thomaston, Torrington, Washington, Warren, Waterbury, Watertown, West Cornwall, Wolcott, Woodbury, Winchester, and Winsted
 Southeastern District serves the following communities: Chester, Clinton, Cromwell, Deep River, Durham,  East Haddam, East Hampton, East Lyme, Essex, Groton, Haddam, Killingworth, Ledyard, Middlefield, Middletown, Montville, North Stonington, New London, Norwich, Old Lyme, Old Saybrook, Portland, Preston, Salem, Stonington, Waterford, Westbrook, and Fisher’s Island, (NY). 
 Scoutreach Division

Camps

Camp Mattatuck
www.CampMattatuck.org
Established in 1939, Camp Mattatuck sits on 500 acres of land outside Waterbury, CT. Each summer, Camp Mattatuck runs a Scouts, BSA Resident Camp, Cub Scout Resident Camp, Webelos Resident camp and a Cub Scout Day Camp. Camp Mattatuck also hosts a variety of seasonal events such as fishing derbies, klondike derbies, camporees and a Halloween Haunted Woods.

The camp is available year-round for seasonal camping through our cabins, Adirondack shelters and tent sites. We are conveniently located off CT Route 8 in Plymouth, CT, just a few miles north of Waterbury, CT, 90 miles northeast of New York City and 130 miles southwest of Boston, MA.

It is part of Connecticut Rivers Council and is supported by the Connecticut Rivers Council through Friends of Scouting donations, solicitation of direct assistance, grants and foundations, Unit Popcorn sales, the Council endowment funds and the Camp Mattatuck Volunteers.

Mattatuck hosts its own Cub Scout Day Camp in addition to its resident Boy Scout camp, which serve about 400 Cub Scouts and 1,100 Boy Scouts each summer. Seven cabins on the camp grounds allow for winter camping. An extensive Challenge Course and Climbing Program are also available to Scouts, school systems and corporate groups.

June Norcross Webster Scout Reservation

The camp is located in the scenic New England Town of Ashford, Connecticut. Originally opened as Camp Ashford on June 28, 1964, today the reservation occupies  of land and a  man-made lake named Goss Pond. The camp is located on the farm once owned by Lt. Col. Thomas Knowlton, hero of the Battle of Bunker Hill and a commander in the Continental Army. The reservation has two camps; The Stanley Black & Decker Base Camp and the Cub Country. In 1963, Eastern Connecticut Council sold Camp Quinebaug to purchase  property with a  lake in Ashford, Connecticut. The camp was named Camp Ashford and was officially opened on June 28, 1964. After two years of operations, the name was changed to June Norcross Webster Scout Reservation after a donation on behalf of June Norcross-Webster, of the Norcross Greeting Card Company. A large land donation was also made by the Brand Trust. The Base Camp (Ashford 1) is the home to the Boy Scout Resident camp while the Cub Country (Ashford 2) is home to Cub Scout Resident Camp, Akela Day Camp & NYLT.  The reservation has been operated by three different councils: Eastern Connecticut Council of Norwich, Connecticut 1964-1971, Indian Trails Council of Norwich, Connecticut 1971-1995 and Connecticut Rivers Council of East Hartford, Connecticut since 1995. It is the largest Scout Camp in the State of Connecticut.

Mark Greer Scout Reservation
This  camp was located in Bozrah, Connecticut and was established in 1947 by the Middlesex County Council of the Boy Scouts of America. It was the chief summer camp for Boy Scouts from this small council from 1947 until a merger of five councils in 1972. The Long Rivers Council, which resulted from this merger, used this camp as a Boy Scout summer camp up until 1976, when a declining Boy Scout-aged population forced the council to end the summer camp program. By the mid-1960s, the Camp Tadma property also became known as Mark Greer Scout Reservation in honor of a local Scouting patron.

There were five campsites available: Pioneer, Mohegan, Kiehtan, Tantaquidgeon and Uncas. The dining hall was also a small operation and could not have fit much more than 120 Scouts. During its last year of camp operations in 1976, the Tadma kitchen was run by Joe Grillo, who would go on to become the famous PGA caddy Joe "Gypsy" Grillo.

The council attempted to make the camp a high adventure base in 1977 and 1978, but demand was not there. It ran a pilot Cub Scout day camp during the summer of 1977. In the 1990s, Tadma's Venture Post number 78 was chosen to represent the year, 1978, that the council decided to make Camp Tadma strictly a Cub Scout resident camp during the summer camp season. In 1979, Long Rivers Council reopened summer camping at Camp Tadma for Webelos. Its program was one of five camps in the nation that was used to create the Cub Scout Camping Program in 1984. With the Long Rivers-Indian Trails Council merger in the 1990s, Camp Tadma retained this summer camp program but closed as a resident camp in 2013. The property was Sold to a local Church in February 2015.

Frederick Sprague Barbour Scout Reservation
The  camp is located in Norfolk, Connecticut. It is suitable for wilderness camping.
The camp was devastated after an ice storm. However, in November 2010, a campwide project was held to restore the camp. Around 70 Scouts from the Connecticut Rivers Council helped to refurbish the camp, which is now usable again.

Camp Workcoeman
Camp Workcoeman is located on the shore of West Hill Lake in New Hartford, Connecticut. Established in 1924, it is one of the oldest, continuously-operated Scout camps in the country. For over 90 years, thousands of Scouts and Scouters have experienced Scouting at its best at Camp Workcoeman. It is also home to Laurel Music Camp. In 1994, Camp Workcoeman was part of a study conducted by the National Boy Scout Council for exemplary Scout camps in the country. 

The program includes Swimming and Boating on the West Hill Pond (sail boats, snorkeling, stand-up paddle boards, underwater nature hike, team canoeing, campwide aquatic meet, kayaking and Polar Bear Swim). Older Scouts can use the Shawtown Wilderness Trek. For younger Scouts, the Tenderfoot's Compass Program is offered. This program, based around the patrol method, focuses on teaching basic Scouting skills and includes Swimming Merit Badge. Each week a number of campwide activities are scheduled, including Aquatic Meet, Scoutmaster Shoot-Off, Friday Night Campfire, Saturday Court of Honor and Family Bar-B-Que.

Order of the Arrow

Tschitani Lodge No. 10 is the Order of the Arrow lodge for the Connecticut Rivers Council. The name translates to "stronger one" in Lenape. Their totem is of two Americans Indians shooting arrows. The lodge was created with the merger of Sassacus and Eluwak in 1995.

Before the merge, a joint meeting between the two lodges was held at Camp Tadma in the spring of 1995. In fall, a joint lodge conclave was held, hosted by Sassacus Lodge, at June Norcross Webster Scout Reservation in Ashford. On September 17, 1995 the membership voted on their by-laws, chose the name Tschitani for the new lodge and a slate of officers were elected. An Official Charter was given to the Tschitani Lodge on January 1, 1996, and the first Lodge Chief was Brian Dabkowski of Middlebury, CT.

In the spring of 1996 and again in 2001, Tschitani Lodge hosted the Section NE-1B Conclave at Camp June Norcross Webster Scout Reservation. The theme for the weekend was "The Journey Starts from Within." 2003 saw a slight change in the by-laws to allow the election of two lodge vice chiefs and changed election procedures.

At the 2005 National Order of the Arrow Conference, Tschitani Lodge received the 2004 and 2006 NOAC Spirit Award and the ceremonial team received Honor Medals. The lodge received the National Quality Lodge award in 1997 and 2002. As the first lodge in the state, it was recipient of the National OA Service Grant in 2005.

See also
 Scouting in Connecticut

External links

References

Local councils of the Boy Scouts of America
Youth organizations based in Connecticut
Northeast Region (Boy Scouts of America)
1995 establishments in Connecticut